Anavatti  is a town in Shivamogga district of Karnataka.  

Anavatti is famous for magnificent Kaitabheshwara Temple and an ancient Kotilingeshwara temple located little outside the town, northerly.

Demographics
As of 2001 India census, Anavatti had a population of 8168 with 4059 males and 4109 females.

See also
 Sirsi

 Shimoga

 Districts of Karnataka

References

External links
 http://Shimoga.nic.in/

Cities and towns in Shimoga district
Villages in Shimoga district